This article is about the particular significance of the year 1870 to Wales and its people.

Incumbents

Lord Lieutenant of Anglesey – William Owen Stanley 
Lord Lieutenant of Brecknockshire – Charles Morgan, 1st Baron Tredegar
Lord Lieutenant of Caernarvonshire – Edward Douglas-Pennant, 1st Baron Penrhyn 
Lord Lieutenant of Cardiganshire – Edward Pryse
Lord Lieutenant of Carmarthenshire – John Campbell, 2nd Earl Cawdor 
Lord Lieutenant of Denbighshire – Robert Myddelton Biddulph    
Lord Lieutenant of Flintshire – Sir Stephen Glynne, 9th Baronet 
Lord Lieutenant of Glamorgan – Christopher Rice Mansel Talbot 
Lord Lieutenant of Merionethshire – Edward Lloyd-Mostyn, 2nd Baron Mostyn
Lord Lieutenant of Monmouthshire – Henry Somerset, 8th Duke of Beaufort
Lord Lieutenant of Montgomeryshire – Sudeley Hanbury-Tracy, 3rd Baron Sudeley
Lord Lieutenant of Pembrokeshire – William Edwardes, 3rd Baron Kensington
Lord Lieutenant of Radnorshire – John Walsh, 1st Baron Ormathwaite

Bishop of Bangor – James Colquhoun Campbell
Bishop of Llandaff – Alfred Ollivant 
Bishop of St Asaph – Thomas Vowler Short (retired); Joshua Hughes (from 9 May)
Bishop of St Davids – Connop Thirlwall

Events
January — Francis Kilvert begins his famous diary.
10 February — In a mining accident at Morfa Colliery, Port Talbot, 30 men are killed.
Sir George Gilbert Scott completes the restoration of Bangor Cathedral.
George Osborne Morgan introduces the Burials Bill and the Places of Worship (Acquisition of Land) Bill to Parliament.
Timothy Richards Lewis discovers a nematoid worm, later Filaria sanguinis hominis.
William Thomas Lewis, 1st Baron Merthyr of Senghenydd, begins acquiring the collieries later known as the Lewis Merthyr collieries in Rhondda.
Jacob Lloyd is created a Knight of the Order of S. Gregory by Pope Pius IX.
Thomas William Rhys Davids begins a series of articles for the Ceylon branch of the Royal Asiatic Society Journal.

Arts and literature

New books
John Ceiriog Hughes — Oriau'r Haf
David Lloyd Davies — Ceinwen Morgan neu y Rian Ddiwylliedig
Richard Davies (Mynyddog) — Yr Ail Gynnig

Music

Sport
Billiards — John Roberts, Sr. loses the English billiards championship after 21 years.
Association football — Druids of Rhiwabon formed.

Births
13 January — Conway Rees, rugby player (died 1932)
20 March — Eluned Morgan, author (died 1938)
25 March — Wallace Watts, Wales international rugby union player (died 1950)
19 June — Charles Nicholl, Wales international rugby union player (died 1939)
29 June
Arthur Boucher, Wales international rugby union player (died 1948)
Sir Charles Dillwyn-Venables-Llewellyn, 2nd Baronet, politician (died 1951)
27 July — Herbert Millingchamp Vaughan, historian (died 1948)
18 August — William Cope, 1st Baron Cope, politician and Wales international rugby player (died 1946)
27 September — Thomas Jones (T. J.), civil servant (died 1955)
3 November — Norman Biggs, Wales international rugby player (died 1908)
15 November — William Elsey, Wales international rugby player (died 1936)
20 December — Sir David Davies, politician (died 1958)
29 December — Robert Dewi Williams, teacher, minister and writer (died 1955)
31 December — David John Jones, Dean of Llandaff (died 1949)
date unknown — John Hughes Morris, missionary (died 1953)

Deaths
16 March — Thomas Parry, Bishop of Barbados, 74
4 April — Owen Wynne Jones, writer, 42
15 May — Charles Hinde (army officer), soldier, 49
23 June — Isaac Hughes, Calvinist missionary and preacher, 71/72
27 May — John Etherington Welch Rolls, Monmouthshire landowner and father of 1st Baron Llangattock, 63
1 August — Levi Gibbon, balladeer, 92
17 September — Joseph David Jones, composer, 43
16 November — Harry Longueville Jones, antiquary, 64

References

 
Wales